HMS Nomad was an  built for the Royal Navy during the First World War. She was sunk during the Battle of Jutland in 1916.

Description
The Admiralty M class were improved and faster versions of the preceding . They displaced . They were powered by three Parsons direct-drive steam turbines, each driving one propeller shaft, using steam provided by four Yarrow boilers. The ships' complement was 76 officers and ratings.

The ships were armed with three single QF  Mark IV guns and two QF 1.5-pounder (37 mm) anti-aircraft guns. These latter guns were later replaced by a pair of QF 2-pounder (40 mm) "pom-pom" anti-aircraft guns. The ships were also fitted with two above water twin mounts for  torpedoes.

Construction and service
Nomad was ordered under the Third War Programme in November 1914 and built by Alexander Stephen and Sons at their shipyard in Linthouse. The ship was launched on 7 February 1916 and completed in April 1916. She was commissioned under the command of Lieutenant-Commander Paul Whitfield and briefly served in the 13th Destroyer Flotilla of the Grand Fleet.

Nomad was part of the 13th Destroyer Flotilla at the Battle of Jutland on 31 May 1916. At 16:09 hr, Admiral Jellicoe commander of the Grand Fleet ordered the 13th Flotilla to launch a torpedo attack against German battlecruisers, while at almost the same time, Admiral Hipper, commander of the German battlecruisers, ordered a torpedo attack on British battlecruisers by the German 9th Flotilla. The two destroyer forces became involved in an intense engagement, during which Nomad was disabled by a shell hit in her engine room. Two torpedoes fired by the German destroyers at Nestor failed to strike, passing under the British destroyer. Later that afternoon, Nomad, together with sister ship , also immobilised in the earlier attack, was engaged by German battleships. She was heavily hit, with the damage forcing her crew to abandon ship, while a final hit caused Nomads forward magazine to explode, the destroyer sinking at 17:30 hr, with Nestor sinking shortly afterwards. Eight of Nomads crew were killed while 72 survivors (including Whitfield) were rescued from the sea by German torpedo boats and became prisoners-of-war.

The wreck is designated as a protected place under the Protection of Military Remains Act 1986. The wreck of Nomad was found by accident in 2001 by a dive team including marine archaeologist Innes McCartney. The ship's bell can be seen on display at the Jutland shipwreck museum.

Popular culture
She was depicted in a book called Prisoner of War, by Martin Booth, serving as the protagonist's ship.

Notes

Bibliography

External links
 http://www.battleships-cruisers.co.uk/destroyers_before_1900.htm
 SI 2008/0950 Designation under the Protection of Military Remains Act 1986
 Battle of Jutland Crew Lists Project - HMS Nomad Crew List

 

Admiralty M-class destroyers
Ships built on the River Clyde
1916 ships
World War I destroyers of the United Kingdom
Maritime incidents in 1916
Ships sunk at the Battle of Jutland
Protected Wrecks of the United Kingdom
Naval magazine explosions